Porto da Cruz (is a civil parish in the municipality of Machico in the northeastern corner of Madeira. The population in 2011 was 2,597, in an area of 25.22 km².

History

The origin of the community's name came from the fact that the original discoverer affixed a steel cross at the port, in order to better identify the location to ocean travelers. During the early settlement of the northern coast, goods destined for the northern communities (such as Santo António da Serra) were offloaded in the harbor.

The parish of Porto da Cruz was created on 26 September 1577, by Jerónimo Barreto, establishing as its patron Nossa Senhora da Piedade. During the contract signing, the formal donation identified the new church as Nossa Senhora da Glória, but after completion, it was consecrated as Nossa Senhora de Guadalupe.
 
Since its establishment, the parish pertained to the Captaincy of Machico, but in 1835, it was integrated into the municipality of Santana with the administrative reforms of the Liberal regime. On 19 October 1852, these changes were nullified and the parish returned to the municipality of Machico.

Cultivation and harvesting of sugarcane occupied the activities of early settlers. The aguardente factory, completed after 1858, was part of this industry, converting the grapes and juice into a local spirit, uniquely cultivating the American caste of grape in this territory.

Geography
The northern parish is enveloped by the mountains of Paul da Serra: Pico da Suna (1040 metres), Pico do Larano (765 metres) and Pico da Maiata (766 metres) are the highest points in the parish. Even along the coast, Penha de Águia (a mountainous escarpment 580 metres in altitude) is difficult to climb; the area, Penha da Águia, means mountain of the eagles, giving the impression that only the birds settle these lands.

The rugged terrain and difficult communication has, over the years, resulted in small agglomerations of inhabitants, resulting in a "community of communities" that includes 78 different localities:

 Cabeço da Volta
 Cabeço do Vento
 Cabeço Velho
 Caias Velho
 Cal
 Caldeirão
 Canavieira
 Cancela – Larano
 Casas Próximas
 Castelejo
 Carquejas
 Cerrado
 Chã
 Chãs
 Chão da Cevada
 Chão das Feiteiras
 Chão das Moiras
 Chão dos Tocos
 Chiqueiros
 Choupana
 Caminho Chão
 Caminho do Moinho
 Caminho Novo
 Córrego da Lapa
 Currais
 Curralinho
 Degolada
 Eira (Referta)
 Eira do Toco
 Espigão
 Espigão Amarelo
 Fajã da Madeira
 Fajã do Mar
 Fajã do Milho
 Fajã da Palmeira
 Fajanzinha
 Fajã do Furado
 Folhadal
 Fontana
 Fonte Vermelha
 Fontes
 Fontinha
 Francelho
 Forca dos Ratos
 Fonte São João da Fonte
 Furado
 Furna do Negro
 Galo
 Gambão
 Ginjas
 Ilhéu
 Jangalinha
 Jãvelho
 Jogo da Bola
 Juncal
 Junqueira
 Ladeiras
 Ladeira da Rocha
 Ladeirada Paulina
 Lajedo
 Lajinha
 Lamaceiros
 Lameiro
 Larano
 Lava-pés
 Levadiça
 Lombinho
 Lombo
 Lombo do António Dias
 Lombo do Capitão
 Lombo da Carqueja
 Lombo Comprido
 Lombo do Cura
 Lombo da Forma
 Lombo do João Nunes
 Lombo dos Leais (Folhadal)
 Lombo do Morgado

References

Parishes of Machico, Madeira